Metrico is a puzzle-platform game developed and published by indepdendent Dutch developer Digital Dreams for the PlayStation Vita. The music is by Dutch electronic music producer Palmbomen. It was released in North America on 5 August 2014, and in Europe on 6 August 2014. Metrico was initially available for free for members of PlayStation Plus.

A re-release of the original game with additional content was released for Microsoft Windows, PlayStation 4, and Xbox One on 23 August 2016 entitled Metrico+.

Gameplay
Metrico is a 3D-platform game, and levels often have simple colour-schemes. Typically, level backgrounds are a solid colour, and the midground may include visuals such as mountains, which are typically simple-toned prisms. Platforms are mostly simple-toned geometric shapes, such as cubes and 3D-rectangles.

Reception

Metrico received mixed reviews from critics. On aggregators GameRankings and Metacritic, it holds a score of 70% and 68 respectively. Colin Moriarty, reviewing for IGN, praised the game's "ingenious puzzles", but noted some technical issues and the game's use of "gimmicky, sometimes broken controls". Likewise, GameSpot's reviewer Josiah Renaudin criticized Metrico's "often unwieldy controls", but noted a "beautiful audiovisual blend" and "exciting sense of discovery".

References

External links
 

2014 video games
Indie video games
PlayStation Network games
PlayStation Vita games
PlayStation 4 games
Puzzle-platform games
Single-player video games
Video games developed in the Netherlands
Windows games
Xbox One games